The Reckoning is an Australian crime thriller feature film written and directed by John V. Soto and starring Luke Hemsworth, Viva Bianca, Jonathan LaPaglia, Hanna Mangan-Lawrence, and Alex Williams. The film premiered at the British Independent Film Festival in London on 10 May 2014, where it won Best Director and Best Music.

Synopsis
When Detective Robbie Green (Jonathan LaPaglia) is called in to investigate the murder of his colleague Jason Pearson (Luke Hemsworth), he discovers at the crime scene a SD card from a video camera. The card contains footage shot by two runaway teenagers, Rachel (Hanna Mangan-Lawrence) and AJ (Alex Williams), who are making a documentary about the drug related death of Rachel's sister.

Robbie and Detective Jane Lambert (Viva Bianca) start to retrace the teen's journey and soon the pair begin to uncover a trail of the dead. Video footage reveals Jason being connected to the drug operation and he later gives Robbie up as being involved in the death of Rachel's sister.

Robbie is discharged from the investigation and sent home late at night, only to find his family being held hostage by AJ and Rachel. After a gunfight, and with the police approaching the home, Rachel takes Robbie up onto the roof at gunpoint, with nothing but revenge on her mind.

Cast
The cast includes:
 Luke Hemsworth as Detective Jason Pearson
 Viva Bianca as Detective Jane Lambert
 Jonathan LaPaglia as Detective Robbie Green
 Hanna Mangan-Lawrence as Rachel Saunders
 Alex Williams as Andrew "AJ" Jamison
 Tom O'Sullivan as Connor
 Amanda Dow as Maxine
 Chelsea Williamson as Abbie Saunders
 Kelsie Anderson as Sarah
 Renato Fabretti as Alex
 Katie Dorman as Renee
 Priscilla-Anne Forder as Officer Sally Franklin

Production
The Reckoning was written and directed by John V. Soto,

Filming took place in Perth, Western Australia.

Release 
The world premiere of The Reckoning was held at the British Independent Film Festival
at the Empire, Leicester Square in London, on 10 May 2014. The film made its Australian premiere at CinefestOz on 23 August and had a limited national release across five Australian cinemas, two in Perth and one each in Sydney, Melbourne and Brisbane on 5 September.

The thriller opened in limited release in Sydney, Melbourne, Brisbane and Perth on 5 September 2014 following their Australian premiere at CinefestOz on 29 August 2014. The film was officially selected to screen in Cannes 15 May 2015 as part of the Antipodes collection for Cannes Cinephiles. The Reckoning was produced by Filmscope Entertainment's Deidre Kitcher. It had its Australian TV Premiere on 7 December 2015 on Network TEN.

Lightning Entertainment has sold The Reckoning in over 40 overseas markets, including Portugal (Media Page),the USA (Anchor Bay/Starz), South Africa (Ster Kinekor), Scandinavia (Atlantic Films), Turkey (Movie Box), Korea (SB), the Middle East (Eagle Entertainment), Mexico (Renaissance) and Thailand (IPA).

Reception
The Reckoning has received mainly positive reviews from the media. Gavin Bond of the Perth newspaper The Sunday Times praised the film as "an accomplished, refreshingly gritty and thoroughly entertaining thriller." Philippa Hawker from The Age stated that The Reckoning was "an intriguing thriller that interweaves two accounts of guilt and revelation". Andrew Urban from Urban Cinefile said, "A strong screenplay, coupled with an interesting cinematic structure and great images make this an engaging film with tension and texture." Who Weekly's Andiee Pavious remarked that "From seemingly foreseeable beginnings, his (John V. Soto) deceptive screenplay ricochets through a bloodied thicket of hoops that one by one call everyone's integrity to account. Prepare to be unprepared." Erin Free from Filmink lauded the film, saying "Writer/Director John V. Soto delivers his best film yet with this tight, taut and compelling thriller".

Awards and nominations

References

External links
 
 

2014 crime thriller films
2014 films
Australian crime thriller films
Films shot in Perth, Western Australia
2010s English-language films
Films directed by John V. Soto